Ana Patrícia Robert de Oliveira Rente (born 27 April 1988) is a Portuguese Olympic trampoline gymnast from Coimbra. She competed at the 2008, 2012 and 2016 Summer Olympics, and won the women's synchronized bronze medal at the 2015 European Games, together with Beatriz Martins.

References

External links
 
 
 
 
 

1988 births
Living people
Sportspeople from Coimbra
Portuguese female trampolinists
Olympic gymnasts of Portugal
Gymnasts at the 2008 Summer Olympics
Gymnasts at the 2012 Summer Olympics
Gymnasts at the 2016 Summer Olympics
European Games bronze medalists for Portugal
European Games medalists in gymnastics
Gymnasts at the 2015 European Games
Competitors at the 2009 World Games
21st-century Portuguese women